Warren Entner (born 1944) is an American singer, songwriter, organist and guitarist for the rock and roll band, The Grass Roots. He then became a manager for several successful heavy metal/rock groups.

Overview

Entner is best known for his vocal contributions on some of The Grass Roots' biggest hits, most notably the memorable "1-2-3-4" count-in to the chorus, as well as lead vocal on the chorus, of Let's Live for Today and the Middle 8 of the song Midnight Confessions.

Entner and his group The Grass Roots played at the Fantasy Fair and Magic Mountain Music Festival on Sunday June 11, 1967, in the "summer of love" as their top ten hit "Let's Live For Today" was hitting the airwaves. This music festival is important because it occurred before the Monterey Pop Festival but did not have a movie to document it for the ages (see List of electronic music festivals). On Sunday October 27, 1968, they played at the San Francisco Pop Festival and then played at the Los Angeles Pop Festival and Miami Pop Festival in December of that year as their top ten hit "Midnight Confessions" was hitting the airwaves.

Entner and his group The Grass Roots played at Newport Pop Festival 1969 at Devonshire Downs which was a racetrack at the time but now is part of the North Campus for California State University at Northridge. They played on Sunday June 22 which was the final day of the festival as their top twenty hit "Wait A Million Years" was hitting the airwaves. In Canada, they played at the Vancouver Pop Festival at the Paradise Valley Resort in British Columbia in August 1969 (see List of electronic music festivals).

Entner had the opportunity to network with many famous groups and musicians playing these large festivals. This helped him fine tune his skills as a group manager. It was with The Grass Roots that Entner practiced his first efforts as band manager that he would fine tune to become a professional manager for other groups after 1974. Entner identified several songs written by other composers that proved successful when The Grass Roots covered them. He was instrumental in identifying "Let's Live For Today", "Midnight Confessions" and "Lovin' Things" (written by Artie Schroeck) to name a few.

In 1970, he married the Welsh actress, model and beauty queen, Miss World 1961, Rosemarie Frankland. In 1976, she gave birth to their only child together, a daughter, Jessica. The couple divorced in 1981. He was married again on May 25, 1985, to Stacey Elizabeth Babbitt, who gave birth to his second child, Lauren, in 1986.

Compositions and musical release performance

Entner composed twenty one songs for The Grass Roots. Two of these appeared as single "A" sides. They are "Feelings" and "Come On And Say It". His other nineteen compositions appeared on single "B" sides and albums. He wrote frequently with Rob Grill and they were considered a songwriting team. Entner played with the group on their first nine albums – seven of which charted. He took part in the first twenty five singles released, twenty of which charted.

Group management

After departing from The Grass Roots in the mid 70s, Entner went behind the scenes of the music business and became a successful manager. Owning his own firm Warren Entner Management, Entner managed a number of successful hard rock artists including Angel, Quiet Riot, Faith No More, Rage Against the Machine, Deftones, as well as other acts such as The Grays, Failure and Nada Surf. He currently manages Biffy Clyro in the US.

Discography

Singles

++ – Gold Record – RIAA Certification

+++ – Composed by Italian superstar Lucio Battisti)

Albums

++ – Gold Record – RIAA Certification

References

External links 

 Official Grass Roots Website

1944 births
American male singer-songwriters
American rock songwriters
American rock singers
American rock guitarists
American folk guitarists
American male guitarists
American rock keyboardists
American music managers
Living people
Musicians from Boston
Singer-songwriters from Massachusetts
Guitarists from Massachusetts
20th-century American guitarists
20th-century American male musicians